This is a list of members of the Tasmanian House of Assembly between the 13 December 1941 election and the 23 November 1946 election. The term was elongated due to World War II.

Notes
  Labor MHA for Bass, Thomas Davies, died on 11 September 1942. A recount on 23 September 1942 resulted in the election of Labor candidate John Quintal. Quintal was believed to be the first direct descendant of a Bounty mutineer to be elected to any Australian parliament.
  Labor MHA for Wilmot, David O'Keefe, died on 21 July 1943. A recount on 5 August 1943 resulted in the election of Labor candidate Peter Pike.
  Labor MHA for Darwin, Thomas d'Alton, resigned in April 1944. A recount on 26 April 1944 resulted in the election of Labor candidate Michael Adye Smith.
  Labor MHA for Bass, John McDonald, resigned on 16 April 1945. A recount on 26 April 1945 resulted in the election of Labor candidate Alan Welsh.
  Labor MHA for Denison, Edmund Dwyer-Gray, died on 6 December 1945. A recount on 20 December 1945 resulted in the election of Labor candidate and former MHA Francis Heerey.
  Nationalist MHA for Denison, John Soundy, resigned to stand for the Hobart seat in the Legislative Council. A recount on 19 April 1946 resulted in the election of Robert Harvey.

Sources
 
 Parliament of Tasmania (2006). The Parliament of Tasmania from 1856

Members of Tasmanian parliaments by term
20th-century Australian politicians